The following highways are numbered 48:

Australia
 Illawarra Highway

Canada
 Alberta Highway 48
 Ontario Highway 48
 Saskatchewan Highway 48

Czech Republic
 D48 motorway (Czech Republic) part of  European route E462
 I/48; Czech: Silnice I/48

Hungary
 Main road 48 (Hungary)

India
  National Highway 48 (India)

Iran
Road 48

Italy
 State road 48

Japan
 Japan National Route 48

Korea, South
 National Route 48

New Zealand
 New Zealand State Highway 48

United Kingdom
 British A48 (Highnam-Carmarthen)
 British M48 (Olveston-Magor)

United States
 U.S. Route 48
 U.S. Route 48 (1926) (former)
 U.S. Route 48 (1965-1991) (former)
 Alabama State Route 48
 Arkansas Highway 48
 California State Route 48
 Delaware Route 48
 Florida State Road 48
 County Road 48 (Citrus County, Florida)
 County Road 48 (Sumter County, Florida)
 Georgia State Route 48
 Idaho State Highway 48
 Illinois Route 48
 Indiana State Road 48
 Iowa Highway 48
 Kentucky Route 48
 Louisiana Highway 48
 Maryland Route 48 (former)
 M-48 (Michigan highway)
 Minnesota State Highway 48
 County Road 48 (Ramsey County, Minnesota)
 County Road 48 (St. Louis County, Minnesota)
 Mississippi Highway 48
 Missouri Route 48
 Montana Highway 48
Nebraska Highway 48 (former)
 Nebraska Recreation Road 48B
 Nevada State Route 48
 New Jersey Route 48
 County Route 48 (Bergen County, New Jersey)
 County Route S48 (Bergen County, New Jersey)
 County Route 48 (Monmouth County, New Jersey)
 New Mexico State Road 48
 New York State Route 48
 County Route 48 (Allegany County, New York)
 County Route 48 (Broome County, New York)
 County Route 48 (Cayuga County, New York)
 County Route 48 (Chautauqua County, New York)
 County Route 48 (Chemung County, New York)
 County Route 48 (Dutchess County, New York)
 County Route 48 (Essex County, New York)
 County Route 48 (Franklin County, New York)
 County Route 48 (Genesee County, New York)
 County Route 48 (Orange County, New York)
 County Route 48 (Otsego County, New York)
 County Route 48 (Putnam County, New York)
 County Route 48 (Rensselaer County, New York)
 County Route 48 (Schenectady County, New York)
 County Route 48 (St. Lawrence County, New York)
 County Route 48 (Suffolk County, New York)
 County Route 48 (Sullivan County, New York)
 County Route 48 (Warren County, New York)
 County Route 48 (Washington County, New York)
 North Carolina Highway 48
 North Dakota Highway 48
 Ohio State Route 48
 Oklahoma State Highway 48
 Pennsylvania Route 48
 South Carolina Highway 48
 South Dakota Highway 48
 Tennessee State Route 48
 Texas State Highway 48
 Texas State Highway Loop 48
 Farm to Market Road 48
 Texas Park Road 48
 Utah State Route 48
 Virginia State Route 48
 Virginia State Route 48 (1928-1934) (former)
 West Virginia Route 48 (1920s) (former)
 Wisconsin Highway 48

See also
List of highways numbered 48A
A48 (disambiguation)